

Facilities and services
The Temora–Roto railway line opened in 1916. Passenger services ceased in 1983 and the railway station closed in 1985. However the line remains open for goods trains.

The Binya post office was opened on 19 June 1916.

Sport

Binya Football Club won the Griffith Football Association premiership, defeating Griffith in the grand final.
The Binya Football Club (Australian Rules Football) won five successive premierships from 1934 to 1938 in the Barellan Ardlethan Football League.

Notable People
Thomas Conlan: School Captain 2005, School Captain 2006

Demography
Like many rural localities in the area, the population has progressively declined over a number of years, evidenced as follows:

See also

 Sandy Creek (Mirrool)

References

Towns in the Riverina
Towns in New South Wales
Narrandera Shire